Gregg Barbanell is an American sound editor. He has been nominated for twelve Primetime Emmy Awards in the category Outstanding Sound Editing. In 2004 he won a Primetime Emmy Award in the category Outstanding Sound Editing for a Nonfiction or Reality Program for the nature documentary television series Dinosaur Planet. He is perhaps best known for his work in Breaking Bad and its spin-off Better Call Saul.

References

External links 

Living people
Place of birth missing (living people)
Year of birth missing (living people)
American sound editors
Primetime Emmy Award winners